Subterinebrica labyrinthana is a species of moth of the family Tortricidae. It is found in Morona-Santiago Province, Ecuador.

The wingspan is about 23 mm. The ground colour of the forewings is white with an indistinct yellowish admixture. The markings are black. The hindwings are white with brownish-grey spots, found mainly in the terminal part of the wing.

Etymology
The species name refers to the forewing pattern and is derived from Greek labyrinthos (meaning labyrinth).

References

Moths described in 2009
Euliini